Cumbernauld railway station serves the town of Cumbernauld, Scotland. Trains serving the station are operated by ScotRail.

Some areas like the Village or Abronhill are not within reasonable walking distance of a station, although Abronhill is close to the line, which has recently been electrified.

History

The station was built by the Caledonian Railway and opened on 7 August 1848 on their line from Gartsherrie (on the former Garnkirk and Glasgow Railway) to Greenhill on the Scottish Central Railway. It was eventually reopened in 1870 to be served by local passenger services from Glasgow Buchanan Street on the lines toward Falkirk & Stirling.

When planning the new town in the 1950s, there was some consideration made to siting the town centre near the current railway station rather than on the hill top. The railway station in this scheme would then have been moved to the Luggie and Shank valley near the A73, beyond Lenziemill and Blairlinn.

However, it wasn't until the after the building of the new town started that the area's population began to expand significantly, and usage of the station increased. This also ensured that the station avoided the Beeching Axe in the early 1960s, even though (as noted) it wasn't particularly well sited for many of the newly built residential developments.

The line did though lose its direct link with the city after the closure to passengers of the Buchanan Street terminus in November 1966. The diversion of all main line expresses and the remaining local routes into Queen Street left the station without any trains serving it, and so a replacement service had to be introduced.

Regular local services southwards towards  and   had also ceased by this time, although a limited number of longer distance trains continued to call there - notably the London Euston to  Clansman & Royal Highlander expresses from the early 1970s onwards.

Through running to Queen Street High Level was eventually introduced in 1989, and since then several intermediate local stations along the line have reopened with backing from the Strathclyde Passenger Transport Executive. The lines to Glasgow & Coatbridge have been electrified (as part of the Edinburgh to Glasgow Improvement Programme), with electric operation beginning in the spring of 2014. This has seen service frequencies on the Glasgow line increased to three per hour, and through running on electric services to the west end of Glasgow via the North Clyde Line through Queen Street Low Level. The station building is also undergoing major refurbishment as part of this work, with a new modular structure opened in July that year.

Further electrification northwards to Greenhill Junction is due for completion in 2018 (as part of the next phase of the EGIP), which will coincide with a further planned timetable recast that will see the existing service to Falkirk doubled to two trains per hour and extended through to Edinburgh Waverley via . This will see the town given direct links to the Scottish capital for the first time, as well as upping the Glasgow Queen Street service frequency to four trains per hour. The timetable upgrade & infrastructure work is being funded by Transport Scotland.

Services

2017 

Off-Peak Monday to Saturday:

2tph to Dumbarton Central via Springburn and Glasgow Queen Street low level.
1tph to Glasgow Queen Street high level.
1tph to Falkirk Grahamston.
1tph to Dalmuir via Motherwell and Glasgow Central Low Level

On Sundays there is an hourly service to Partick via Springburn and Glasgow Queen Street low level.

2018/19 

From December 2018, a new half hourly Glasgow - Edinburgh via Cumbernauld and Falkirk Grahamston service will start, replacing the hourly DMU service and take over the existing EMU service between Springburn and Cumbernauld. The new service will use new Class 385 EMUs. The service between Cumbernauld and Dalmuir via Motherwell and Glasgow Central will continue to operate with existing stock.

The typical Monday - Saturday service will be:

 2tph to Edinburgh via Falkirk Grahamston
 2tph to Glasgow Queen Street High Level
 1tph to Dalmuir via Motherwell and Glasgow Central Low Level

Signalling 
Cumbernauld signal box, which had 35 levers, was located to the north of the station, on the east side of the line. Latterly it worked by Absolute Block to Greenfoot S.B. and by Track Circuit Block to Greenhill Junction S.B. Its primary function was to operate the crossover and reversing siding used by services that terminated & started back from here. This is still in use today.

Cumbernauld signal box closed on 3 May 1999, when the line was resignalled with colour light signals controlled from Cowlairs Signalling Centre.

Gallery

References

Notes

Sources

External links
Railscot - Cumbernauld

Railway stations in North Lanarkshire
SPT railway stations
Railway stations served by ScotRail
Railway stations in Great Britain opened in 1848
Railway stations in Great Britain closed in 1849
Railway stations in Great Britain opened in 1870
Former Caledonian Railway stations
Cumbernauld
1848 establishments in Scotland